The necklaced spinetail (Synallaxis stictothorax) is a species of ovenbird in the family Furnariidae. Found in Ecuador and Peru, its natural habitat is subtropical or tropical dry shrubland.

In early 2021, the former subspecies S. s. chinchipensis was elevated to species status as Chinchipe spinetail (S. chinchipensis).

Description
The forehead is marked with black and white, and there is a white streak above the eye. The upper parts of the body, the wings and the tail are reddish brown. The flanks are buff and the tail feathers have blackish centres giving the tail a bicoloured effect. The throat and underparts are white, with some fine, dark, transverse streaks on the breast.

Distribution and habitat
The necklaced spinetail is native to Ecuador and northern Peru.

Behaviour
The necklaced spinetail is more arboreal, rather bolder and more easily observed than most other members of its genus. The song is a distinctive series of sputtering notes, slowly descending and becoming less rapid and fading away at the conclusion. It is often sung from a perch near the bird's nest, or even from within this conspicuous structure which is globular, with a side entrance, and is made of sticks.

This bird feeds, often in pairs, on small invertebrates which it finds when foraging on the ground in the leaf litter or in the low branches of trees and shrubs.

Status
The necklaced spinetail is a fairly common bird within its rather restricted range. The total number of birds has not been estimated but the population trend seems to be stable so the International Union for Conservation of Nature has assessed its conservation status as being of "least concern".

References

necklaced spinetail
Birds of Ecuador
Birds of Peru
Birds of the Tumbes-Chocó-Magdalena
necklaced spinetail
necklaced spinetail
Taxonomy articles created by Polbot